Göteborg (or Goteborg) is an alternate name of the city of Gothenburg in Sweden

Göteborg and variants may also refer to:

Göteborg Landvetter Airport, airport serving Gothenburg area
Göteborg HC, ice hockey club
Göteborgs FF, football club

Ships
Göteborg-class destroyer, Swedish ship class built 1936–1941
Göteborg-class corvette, Swedish ship class built 1986–1993
Götheborg (ship), Swedish replica sailing ship launched 2003